Joey Beltram (born 6 September 1971) is an American DJ and music producer, best known for his pioneering singles "Energy Flash" and "Mentasm" and for remixing Human Resource's "Dominator".

Rave recordings
"Mentasm", co-produced with Mundo Muzique and released under the artist name Second Phase in 1991, became iconic within rave culture, as it was the track that gave birth to the "mentasm riff" (also known as the "hoover sound"): a churning, dirgelike synth pattern that wormed into techno's communal genome and has since been mutated and reused in thousands of records. The "mentasm riff" is also strongly associated with drum and bass, the Belgian techno scene, and the R&S record label, as well as 
hardcore/hard house in their various permutations since 1994. Beltram was referenced as a pioneer in the late 1990s house music scene by Daft Punk, in their song "Teachers" off their 1997 debut album, Homework and author, Simon Reynolds, credited Beltram with having "revolutionized techno twice before the age of 21," when describing both "Energy Flash" and "Mentasm" in his book Generation Ecstasy.

Throughout the years, Beltram has continually toured at major festivals around the globe. He has also continued releasing techno, with his 1993 and 1994 tracks "Aonox" on Visible and "the Beltram re-releases" on Trax, the "Caliber" EP on Warp, and his 1995 LP Places and 1996 single, "Ball Park" on Tresor counting among his work in the 1990s. He was also invited to release another album, Close Grind, on Daniel Miller's Novamute imprint under the JB³ alias.

In 1999, he launched his own label STX with Arena, while he continued to release under Code 6 and JB³, as well as headlining events such as Awakenings, Coachella, Nature One, Mayday and Dance Valley. Returning to Tresor in 2004, he released the album Rising Sun. And he has kept up a busy release schedule ever since, with tracks on Womb, Harthouse, Drumcode, MB Electroniks, and Bush. Perhaps his best-selling single of recent times is his remix of Oliver Huntemann's "Shanghai Spinner," which hit the Beatport Top 10 in 2009. It was also included in Simian Mobile Disco's Essential Mix at the beginning of 2010.

Selected discography

Singles
"Energy Flash" (1990)
"Mentasm" (1991, as Second Phase)
"Cop Car" (1994)
"Caliber" (1994; UK #96)
"Game Form" (1995)

Compilations
 Classics (1996)
"The Sound of 2AM" (1999)

See also
 Oldskool hardcore
R&S Records
Techno
Transmat
Tresor

References

External links
Joey Beltram discography at Discogs

1971 births
Living people
American musicians of Mexican descent
Musicians from Queens, New York
Club DJs
Rhythm King artists
American techno musicians
Electronic dance music DJs